Eopterosauria is a group of basal pterosaurs from the Triassic, which form their own clade. The term was first used in Andres et al. (2014) to include Preondactylus, Austriadactylus, Peteinosaurus and Eudimorphodontidae. Inside the group were two other new clades, Preondactylia, which included Preondactylus and Austriadactylus, and Eudimorphodontoidea, to include Eudimorphodontidae and Raeticodactylidae. Eopterosauria was defined as "the least inclusive clade containing Preondactylus buffarinii and Eudimorphodon ranzii". The specimen BSP 1994, previously assigned to Eudimorphodon, was named the separate taxon Austriadraco in 2015, and assigned to the new family Austriadraconidae, but further classification was not described. The following phylogenetic analysis follows the topology of Andres et al. (2014).

In a 2020 study of early pterosaur interrelationships carried out by Matthew G. Baron, no evidence was found to support the existence of Eopterosauria as an early diverging clade within Pterosauria. Instead, the results of this later analyses suggested that most pterosaurs fall into either Caviramidae or Zambellisauria, with only a small number of taxa falling in a more 'basal' position. The analyses presented by Baron (2020) supported previous hypotheses presented in research that had been published in the previous two years.

References

Pterosaurs
Late Triassic life